Allan Edmund Johnson (March 30, 1935 – February 7, 2019) was a Canadian professional ice hockey forward

Career 
Johnson played 105 games in the National Hockey League for the Montreal Canadiens and Detroit Red Wings between 1957 and 1962. The rest of his career, which lasted from 1954 to 1969, was spent in various minor leagues. Internationally he played for the Canadian national team at the 1965 World Championships.

Career statistics

Regular season and playoffs

International

Awards and achievements
 WHL Coast Division Second All-Star Team (1959)
 WHL First All-Star Team (1960)
 Allan Cup Championship (1964)

References

External links

1935 births
2019 deaths
Canadian ice hockey right wingers
Cincinnati Mohawks (IHL) players
Denver Spurs (WHL) players
Detroit Red Wings players
Fort Worth Wings players
Hershey Bears players
Montreal Canadiens players
Montreal Royals (QSHL) players
Pittsburgh Hornets players
St. Boniface Canadiens players
Shawinigan-Falls Cataracts (QSHL) players
Spokane Comets players
Spokane Spokes players
Ice hockey people from Winnipeg
Winnipeg Warriors (minor pro) players